Aubameyang is a Gabonese surname, examples being:

 Pierre Aubameyang (born 1965), Gabonese footballer and father of 3 footballers:
 Catilina Aubameyang (born 1983), also spelled as Katalena Aubameyang
 Willy Aubameyang (born 1987)
 Pierre-Emerick Aubameyang (born 1989), who signed for Chelsea in 2022

See also
Jean-Hilaire Aubame (1912–1989), Gabonese politician

Gabonese surnames